Joice is both a given name and a surname. Notable people with the name include:

 Joice Heth (c. 1756–1836), African-American woman exhibited by P.T. Barnum, who falsely claimed that she was the 161-year-old nursing mammy of George Washington
 Joice NanKivell Loch (1887–1982), Australian author, journalist and humanitarian worker
 Joice Maduaka (born 1973), British sprinter
 Joice Mujuru (born 1955), Zimbabwean revolutionary and politician
 Dick Joice (1921–1999), British regional television presenter
 Wes Joice (1931–1997), American businessman

See also
 Joyce (name), another given name and surname

Feminine given names